Orrmaesia is a genus of sea snails, marine gastropod mollusks in the family Drilliidae.

Species
Species within the genus Orrmaesia include:
 Orrmaesia ancilla (Thiele, 1925) 
 Orrmaesia dorsicosta Kilburn, 1988
 Orrmaesia longiqua Horro, Gori, Rosado & Rolán, 2021
 Orrmaesia microperforata Horro, Gori, Rosado & Rolán, 2021
 Orrmaesia nucella Kilburn, 1988
Species brought into synonymy
 Orrmaesia innotabilis W.H. Turton, 1932: synonym of Orrmaesia ancilla (K.H.J. Thiele, 1925)

References

 Kilburn R.N. (1988). Turridae (Mollusca: Gastropoda) of southern Africa and Mozambique. Part 4. Subfamilies Drillinae, Crassispirinae and Strictispirinae. Annals of the Natal Museum. 29(1): 167-320.

External links
  Bouchet, P.; Kantor, Y. I.; Sysoev, A.; Puillandre, N. (2011). A new operational classification of the Conoidea (Gastropoda). Journal of Molluscan Studies. 77(3): 273-308

 
Gastropod genera